Euphaedra jacqueshecqui is a butterfly in the family Nymphalidae. It is found in the area of the former province of Équateur in the Democratic Republic of Congo.

References

Butterflies described in 1998
jacqueshecqui
Endemic fauna of the Democratic Republic of the Congo
Butterflies of Africa